Dmytro Oleksandrovych Dubilet (born 27 May 1985) is a Ukrainian banker, businessman, one of the founders of Monobank, the first mobile bank in Ukraine, and politician. On 29 August 2019, he was appointed as the Minister of the Cabinet of Ministers. At the end of 2019, Dubilet left monobank due to the fact that he became a member of the government of Oleksiy Honcharuk, with whom he worked until March 2020. According to Dubilet's declaration for 2019, he sold his stake in monobank for UAH 29.9 million.

Biography 
Dmytro Dubilet was born and raised in Dnipro. He graduated from the Institute of International Relations at the Taras Shevchenko National University of Kyiv (2006). He also studied at the London Business School (2011).

Since 1999, he has worked in various positions, mostly in the banking industry.

From 2012 to 2016, Dubilet served as CIO for PrivatBank.

Since 2015, Dubilet started developing the iGov portal, which aims to fight corruption and provide government basic services online.

In 2017, he co-founded Fintech Band, which launched mobile-only  on the legal basis of Universal bank.

Former advisor to the Head of the Security Service of Ukraine Ivan Bakanov.

See also 
 Honcharuk Government

References

External links 
 

1985 births
Living people
Businesspeople from Dnipro
Taras Shevchenko National University of Kyiv, Institute of International Relations alumni
Alumni of London Business School
Ukrainian bankers
21st-century Ukrainian businesspeople
Cabinet Office ministers of Ukraine
21st-century Ukrainian politicians
Privat Group
Politicians from Dnipro